Bonavista North was a provincial electoral district for the House of Assembly of Newfoundland and Labrador, Canada. It existed from when Newfoundland joined confederation in 1949 until 2015.

As of 2011 the district had 6,956 eligible voters.

When it was abolished in 2015, it contained the communities of: Trinity, Centreville, Wareham, Indian Bay, Greenspond, Valleyfield, Badger's Quay, Pool's Island, Brookfield, Wesleyville, Pound Cove, Templeman, Newtown, Cape Freels, Lumsden, Deadman's Bay, Musgrave Harbour, Ladle Cove, Aspen Cove, Carmanville, Noggin Cove, Frederickton, Davidsville, Main Point, Gander Bay South, Clarke's Head, Victoria Cove, and Wing's Point.

The district's principal industry was fishing. Former Premier Beaton Tulk represented the district until he resigned in 2002.

The district was abolished in 2015 and replaced by Fogo Island-Cape Freels and Bonavista.

Members of the House of Assembly
The district has elected the following Members of the House of Assembly:

Election results

|-

|-

|-

|NDP
|E. Howard Parsons
|align="right"|116
|align="right"|2.00%
|align="right"|+1.42%
|}

|-

|-

|-

|NDP
|E. Howard Parsons
|align="right"|35
|align="right"|0.58%
|align="right"|+0.58%
|}

|-

|-

|}

|-

|-

|-

|NDP
|Wayne Davis
|align="right"|283
|align="right"|4.46%
|align="right"|
|}

 
|NDP
|Ed Brown
|align="right"|349
|align="right"|
|align="right"|
|-
|}

 
|NDP
|Ingwald Feltham
|align="right"|117
|align="right"|
|align="right"|
|-
|}

 
|NDP
|John Blackwood
|align="right"|150
|align="right"|
|align="right"|

|Independent
|Wayne Davis
|align="right"|58
|align="right"|
|align="right"|
|-
|}

|-
|}

References

External links
Website of the Newfoundland and Labrador House of Assembly
Newfoundland & Labrador Votes 2007. Canadian Broadcasting Corporation.

Newfoundland and Labrador provincial electoral districts